Waaris (English: The Heir) is an Indian Hindi drama television series based on the practice of Bacha posh and broadcast on &TV from 16 May 2016 to 1 December 2017. The title track has been sung by Nooran Sisters. It stars Arti Singh, Farnaz Shetty and Neel Motwani.

Premise
Amba Pawania, a Punjabi mother who has 2 daughters is forced to raise her 3rd girl Manpreet as a boy in efforts to keep peace in the village and prevent her violent brother-in-law Jagan from taking leadership.

Plot
Deena tells Amba that if 3rd daughter is born, so she will kill her baby. As Amba unfortunately delivers a daughter, she lies that it is a son and raises her as a boy, becoming a protective mother for her, due to the gender inequality.

7 years later

Amba has brought Manpreet up as Mannu to keep Charan's title and doesn't want Jagan to become the village leader. Manpreet tends to prefer feminine things like Simmi and Gunjan. Simmi learns of her truth and supports Amba. Manpreet befriends the handicapped Raj, who is neglected by Harjeet. Although rivals, the Pawanias and Bajwas work together to bring peace in village. Simmi is pregnant with Raman's child. Mohini secretly shoots Raman; Harjeet shoots Simmi. Bajwas think Manpreet shot Raman. Her and Raj's friendship breaks; he and Amrit leave the Bajwa family.

10 years later

Raj returns and falls for the grown-up Manpreet unaware she is Mannu. Harjeet has married Mohini. Raj learns Manpreet's truth and they marry. He reveals it was a plan to avenge Raman's death, but she enters the Bajwa mansion. Alive and kidnapped by Amba, Simmi is mentally unstable. Rohan finds her. Mohini is afraid as Simmi knows she killed Raman. Raj realises he really loves Manpreet. Mohini is exposed to have killed Raman, and gets arrested. Simmi is secretly married off to Rohan and regains her memory. Raj helps Manpreet in making Amba the leader of Pawanias. The two and Simran-Rohan remarry.

6 years later

Raj and Manpreet have two children, Payal and Rakshit. Simmi and Rohan are parents to Mahima and Aarav. Manpreet teaches them that there's no difference between men and women.

Cast

Main

 Arti Singh as Amba Kaur Dhillon / Amba Charan Pawania (2016–2017)
 Saniya Touqeer as Young Manpreet Pawania / Mannu (2016–2017)
Farnaz Shetty as Manpreet Pawania Bajwa / Preet / Mannu (2017)
Wahib Kapadia as Young Rajveer "Raj" Bajwa (2016–2017)
Neel Motwani as Rajveer "Raj" Bajwa (2017)

Recurring
Anand Suryavanshi as Harjeet Bajwa (2016–2017)
Jaswir Kaur as Mohini Jadhav / Mohini Harjeet Bajwa (2017)
Akshay Dogra as Jagan Pawania (2016–2017)
Farhina Parvez as Simran "Simmi" Pawania / Simran Raman Bajwa / Simran Rohan Bajwa (2016–2017)
Kaivalya Chheda as Sukhveer Pawania (2017)
Viraj Kapoor as Young Rohan Bajwa (2016–2017)
Sanket Choukse as Rohan Bajwa (2017)
Ankita Bahugana as Gunjan Pawania (2017)
Nitin Goswami/Unknown as Aman Pahuja (2016)
Swati Bajpai as Raavi Kaur Chaddha / Raavi Jagan Pawania (2016–2017)
Vandana Lalwani as Amrit Harjeet Bajwa (2016–2017)
Unknown as Bubbly Pawania (2017) 
Kushabh Manghani as Nihaal Bajwa (2017)
Angad Hasija as Chandar Singh Sodhi (2016–2017)
Yatin Mehta as Raman Bajwa (2016–2017)
Eza Sumbul Touqeer as young Gunjan Pawania (2016–2017)
Roop Durgapal/Vindhya Tiwari as Sakshi Sinha (2017)
Lavina Tandon as Swaroop Bajwa (2016)
Mukesh Khanna as Lala Pratap Singh Bajwa (2016)
Sucheta Shivkumar as Deena Pawania (2016)
Rahul Verma Rajput as Ronit Sood (2016)
Lakshya Wahi as Yuvraj (2016)
Dolly Bindra as Mandavati Singh / Dumroo Daayan (2016)
Pankaj Berry as Suraiya (2016)
Gaurav Sharma as Veeresh "Veeru" Singh Dhillon (2016–2017)
Bhavana Balsavar as Sushila Taluja (2016)
Sneh Mirani as young Sukhveer Pawania (2016–2017)
Ashish Kapoor as Jairaj "Jai" Prajapati (2016–2017)
Mohammed Iqbal Khan as Charan Pawania (2016)

Reception
Urmimala Banerjee of Bollywood Life has commented "Waaris has the feel of the JP Dutta films of the 80s – earthy, masculine and dramatic. The highlight is obviously the performances. Right from Iqbal to Aarti Singh, they are in fine form. The plot has resemblances to Anup Singh’s Qissa. Here the difference is instead of the father, it’s the mother who makes her daughter live like a son. According to the makers, it is based on the tradition of Bacha Posh, which is quite prevalent in Afghanistan and Pakistan. With supernatural sagas and family dramas ruling TV, Waaris has a newer theme. It remains to be seen how the makers keep up the tempo, which is quite good in the first episode."

References

External links
Official website
Website on &TV

2016 Indian television series debuts
Hindi-language television shows
Indian drama television series
Television shows set in Punjab, India
&TV original programming
Cross-dressing in television